Eta Linnemann (October 19, 1926 in Osnabrück – 9 May 2009 in Leer (Ostfriesland)) was a German Protestant theologian. In her last years, she broke completely with the theology of her teacher Rudolf Bultmann.

Life
Eta Linnemann studied Protestant theology in Marburg, Tübingen and Göttingen from October 1948 to July 1953. She passed her first and second state examinations in August 1953 and in August 1957, respectively. The Evangelical Lutheran Church of Hanover commissioned Linnemann to write interpretations of biblical texts for religious education. From this work arose her dissertation on the parables of Jesus - Gleichnisse Jesu, Einführung und Auslegung - with which she was promoted to a doctor of theology summa cum laude in July 1961 at the Church University Berlin-Zehlendorf. 

Between 1961 and 1966 she taught at the seminar for church service in Berlin-Zehlendorf, in 1967 she was appointed as Visiting Professor at Braunschweig University of Technology. In February 1970, Eta Linnemann worked in Marburg with Rudolf Bultmann and Ernst Fuchs on studies on the Passion story. On 10 August 1971, she was awarded an honorary professorship of New Testament at the Theological Faculty of the Philipps-University Marburg. The following year, the Braunschweig University of Technology appointed her to the chair of theology and methodology of religious education. Linnemann was a member of the international society Studiorum Novi Testamenti Societas.

Following a conversion experience in 1977, Linnemann caused a stir in 1978 when she to renounced the historical-critical method in 1978 and asked readers to destroy her previous publications. From 1983, at the age of 60, she departed Germany for Indonesia to train pastors at the Theological University of the Indonesian Mission community in Batu. In 2007, she cited Ernst Käsemann and an unnamed ear witness, that Rudolf Bultmann on his death bed had recanted his critical views.

Eta Linnemann lived her last years in the Loga district of Leer.

Influence
Linnemann rejected Markan priority and favored the Independence View of the synoptic gospels. One of Linnemann's views to find support among conservative English speaking scholarship, notably F. David Farnell, was her rejection of a Q (source) for the synoptic Gospels in favour of an explanation following the Jewish requirement of Deuteronomy 19:15 that "on the evidence of two or three witnesses a matter shall be confirmed".

Selected publications
 Bibel oder Bibelkritik? (The Bible or biblical criticism?), Nuremberg 2007
 Historical Criticism of the Bible: Methodology or Ideology? Reflections of a Bultmannian Turned Evangelical, (translated by Robert W Yarbrough), Grand Rapids 2001, Kregel Publications, 
 Gibt es ein synoptisches Problem? (Is there a synoptic problem?), Nuremberg 1999, 4 revised edition. 3rd edition translated into English.
 Wissenschaft oder Meinung? (Science or opinion?), Nuremberg 1999, 2 extended edition
 Bibelkritik auf dem Prüfstand. (Biblical criticism to the test), Nuremberg 1998, 1 Edition
 Studien zur Passionsgeschichte. (Studies on the Passion story), Göttingen, 1970
 Gleichnisse Jesu - Einführung und Auslegung. (The Parables of Jesus - introduction and interpretation), Göttingen 1964, 3rd enlarged edition

References

External links
 Literature of and about Eta Linnemann in the catalog of the German National Library
 Eta Linnemann:  Original oder Fälschung. Historisch-kritische Theologie im Licht der Bibel, Bielefeld 1999 (Original or fake. Historical-critical theology in the light of the Bible, in German, PDF file, 531 kB)
 Robert W. Yarbrough: Eta Linnemann - Friend or Foe of Scholarship, The Master's Seminary Journal 8 (1997), p. 163-189 (English, PDF file, 182 kB)

20th-century German Protestant theologians
Women Christian theologians
1926 births
2009 deaths